Rafael Amador Flores (16 November 1959 – 31 July 2018) was a Mexican professional football defender who played for Mexico in the 1986 FIFA World Cup. He also played and managed Liga MX side Club Universidad Nacional.

After he retired from playing, Amador managed Pumas. He died at age 58 from cancer.

References

External links
FIFA profile

1959 births
2018 deaths
Footballers from Tlaxcala
People from Tlaxcala City
Association football defenders
Mexico international footballers
1986 FIFA World Cup players
Liga MX players
Club Universidad Nacional footballers
Club Puebla players
Mexican football managers
Club Universidad Nacional managers
Mexican footballers